Edwin Davis may refer to:

Edwin Adams Davis (1904–1994), American historian 
Edwin Davis (executioner) (died 1923), New York state executioner
Edwin Hamilton Davis (1811–1888), American archaeologist who studied the Mound Builders
Edwin Davis French (1851–1906), Massachusetts book engraver
Edwin Davis Company, a department store in Kingston-upon-Hull c. 1840–1978